Lycaena phlaeas, the small copper, American copper, or common copper, is a butterfly of the Lycaenids or gossamer-winged butterfly family.  According to Guppy and Shepard (2001), its specific name phlaeas is said to be derived either from the Greek  (phlégo), "to burn up", or from the Latin floreo, "to flourish".

Description
The upperside forewings are a bright orange with a dark outside edge border and with eight or nine black spots. The hindwings are dark with an orange border. Some females also have a row of blue spots inside the orange border and are known as form caeruleopunctata. The undersides are patterned in a similar way but are paler. The black spots on the forewings are outlined in yellow and the dark colouring is replaced by a pale brownish grey. The hindwings are the same brown/grey colour with small black dots and a narrow orange border. The caterpillars (larvae) are usually green, but some have a purple stripe down the middle of the back and along each side.

Range
It is a holarctic species, widespread and common across Europe, Asia, North America, and also found in North Africa south through to Ethiopia.

It can be found almost anywhere in south/central England and Wales although never, it seems, in large numbers. Its distribution becomes more patchy in northern England, Scotland and Ireland.

Habitat
It is found in a wide variety range of habitats from chalk downlands, heathland, and woodland clearings, to churchyards and waste ground in cities.

Habits
In bright sun it is a very active little butterfly with the males setting up small territories which they will defend vigorously against rival males or indeed any unlucky passing insect. Even the shadow of a large bird passing overhead is enough to elicit a response. Females are pursued and mating usually occurs in vegetation.

Life cycle
The eggs are laid singly and conspicuously on the upperside of food plant leaves and the young caterpillar feeds on the underside of the leaf creating "windows" by leaving the upper epidermis of the leaf untouched. Pupation takes place in the leaf litter and the pupa is thought to be tended by ants. There are between two and three broods a year, fewer further north. In exceptionally good years, a fourth brood sometimes occurs in the south and adults can still be seen flying into November. The species overwinters as a caterpillar.

Host plants
Depending on the habitat, common sorrel (Rumex acetosa) and sheep's sorrel (Rumex acetosella) are the two main food plants, although other Rumex species are occasionally used.

Systematics
Lycaena phlaeas belongs to the subgenus Lycaena and is the type-species of genus Lycaena. The species is in turn divided into several subspecies, although many probably lack reason to be named, and others may merit an elevation of rank to be considered autonomous species:

 L. p. hibernica Goodson, 1948 — Republic of Ireland, Northern Ireland 
 L. p. eleus Fabricius, 1798 — England, Wales, Scotland
 L. p. phlaeas Linnaeus, 1761 — Europe, western Siberia, Caucasus, South Caucasus (type locality = Sweden)
 L. p. polaris Courvoisier, 1911 — northern Ural Mountains, northern Siberia, Chukotka Peninsula (Russia)
 L. p. kamtschatica Gorbunov, 1994 — Kamchatka Peninsula (Russia)
 L. p. ganalica Gorbunov, 1995 — Kamchatka Peninsula (Russia)
 L. p. daimio (Seitz, [1909]) — south Kurile Islands, Sakhalin (Russian islands)
 L. p. gonpaensis (Yoshino, [2019]) — North Yunnan, China
 L. p. hypophlaeas (Boisduval, 1852) — N California Sierra Nevada Mts. (Type location) and White Mts., Altai Mountains, southern Siberia, Amur (Russia–NW China border region), northern Ussuri (adjacent to Amur)
 L. p. chinensis (Felder, 1862) — southern Ussuri
 L. p. oxiana (Grum-Grshimailo, 1890) — Kopet Dag mountains, Alai Mountains, Ghissar-Darvaz, Tian Shan mountains
 L. p. comedarum (Grum-Grshimailo, 1890) — eastern Pamir Mountains
 L. p. stygiana Butler, 1880 — western Pamir Mountains
 L. p. shima Gabriel, 1954 — Arabia 
 Lycanea phlaeas pseudophlaeas (Lucas, 1866) — Ethiopia, Uganda
 L. p. ethiopica (Poulton, 1922) — Ruwenzori Mountains (SW Uganda)
 L. p. abbottii (Holland, 1892) — Kenya, Tanzania, Malawi
 L. p. flavens (Ford, 1924) — Tibet
 L. p. coccinea (Ford, 1924)
 L. p. americana (Morris, 1862) — Nova Scotia and W. to Minnesota, and S. to: Virginia, Montane N Georgia, Missouri, Kansas, N Dakota.
 L. p. arethusa (Dod, 1907) — Alberta
 L. p. arctodon Ferris, 1974 — Montana
 L. p. feildeni (McLachlan, 1878) — Ellesmere
 L. p. alpestris Emmel & Pratt, 1998 — California

See also
List of butterflies of India
List of butterflies of India (Lycaenidae)
List of butterflies of Great Britain

References

 Asher, Jim, Martin Warren, Richard Fox, Paul Harding, Gaile Jeffcoate & Stephen Jeffcoate (Eds) (2001) The Millennium Atlas of Butterflies in Britain and Ireland. Oxford University Press.

 Dempster, J.P. & A.M. Emmet (1990) Lycaena phlaeas (Linnaeus). Pp. 134–139 in A. Maitland Emmet, John Heath et al. The Butterflies of Great Britain and Ireland. The Moths and Butterflies of Great Britain and Ireland vol. 7, part 1. Harley Books, Colchester, UK.
 
  
 
 Guppy, C.S. and Shepard, J. (2001) Butterflies of British Columbia British Columbia Museum, Canada.
 
 
 Tomlinson, David & Rob Still (2002) Britain's Butterflies. WildGuides, Old Basing, UK.

External links

 Lycaena at Markku Savela's website on Lepidoptera

phlaeas
Butterflies of Africa
Butterflies of Asia
Butterflies of Europe
Butterflies of North America
Butterflies described in 1761
Taxa named by Carl Linnaeus
Articles containing video clips